Beattie is a Scottish surname, meaning "one who held land on condition of supplying food to those billeted on him by the chief"; "public victualler".

People
 A. L. Beattie (1852–1920), pioneering Chief Mechanical Engineer of the New Zealand Railways Department
 Sir Andrew Beattie (politician) (1860–1923), Irish politician.
 Ann Beattie (born 1947), American writer
 Anthony Beattie (1944–2014), British civil servant 
 Bob Beattie (disambiguation), several people
 Bobby Beattie (1916–2002), Scottish footballer
 Brittany Beattie (born 1994), Australian model
 Catherine Beattie (politician) (1921–2014), American farmer and politician
 Charles Beattie (1899–1958), Northern Irish farmer and briefly Member of Parliament
 Charlton Beattie (1869–1925), United States District Court judge
 Chris Beattie (born 1975), Australian rugby league footballer
 Craig Beattie (born 1984), Scottish footballer
 Daryl Beattie (born 1970), Australian motorcycle racer
 David Beatty, 1st Earl Beatty (1871– 1936), Admiral of the Fleet Royal Navy 
 Dick Beattie (1936–1990), Scottish footballer
 Dud Beattie (1934–2016), Australian rugby league footballer
 Frank Beattie, (1933–2009), Scottish association football player and manager
 George Beattie (disambiguation), several people
 James Beattie (disambiguation), several people
 Jen Beattie (born 1991), Scottish association footballer
 John Beattie (disambiguation), several people
 Joseph Beattie, (born 1978), English actor
 Joseph Hamilton Beattie (1808–1871), locomotive engineer, London and South Western Railway
 Kevin Beattie (1953–2018), English footballer
 Mary Beattie (1923–2015), American politician
 Melody Beattie, (1948–) American author
 Peter Beattie (born 1952), Premier of Queensland (1998–2007) 
Peter J. Beattie (born 1984), American advertising executive
 Robert Beattie (fl. 2000s), American lawyer
 Robert Ethelbert Beattie (1875–1925), Canadian politician
 Robert M. Beattie (born 1962), English gastroenterologist
 Rolla Kent Beattie (1875–1960), American botanist and plant pathologist
 Simon Beattie (born 1975), antiquarian bookseller
 Stephen Beattie (1908–1975), Royal Navy Lieutenant-Commander during the Second World War, winner of the Victoria Cross
 Taylor Beattie (1837–1920), Louisiana politician and judge
 Wendy Beattie, (born 1980), Australian field hockey player
 William Beattie (physician) (1793–1876), Scottish physician and poet
 William Francis Beattie (1886–1918), Scottish sculptor
 William George Beattie (1841–1918), son of Joseph Hamilton Beattie, also locomotive engineer for the London and South Western Railway

See also
 Beatie, given name and surname
 Beatty (surname)
 Batey (surname)

References

External links
Beatty Project 2000 website 

Scottish surnames
Surnames of Irish origin